Joel Benjamin is an American singer and dancer who performed as a child actor, dancer, and singer in seven Broadway theatre productions in the 1960s including Bells are Ringing and The Music Man.

In 1970, Joel Benjamin took over as director of the New Repertory Dance Theatre. He then was director of American Chamber Ballet until it disbanded in 1977, and since that time has specialized in massage therapy for dancers.

References 

Year of birth missing (living people)
Living people
American male dancers
American male singers
Singers from New York City
American theatre directors
Dance managers
Dance therapists